Kirkstead is an ancient village and former civil parish on the River Witham in Lincolnshire, England. It was merged with the civil parish of Woodhall Spa in 1987.

History
Kirkstead has its origins in a Cistercian monastery, Kirkstead Abbey (the name Kirkstead means "the site of a church" ) founded in 1139 by Hugh Brito, lord of Tattershall and originally colonised by an abbot and twelve monks from Fountains Abbey in Yorkshire. It was around this abbey that the little settlement of Kirkstead grew. The abbey remained in existence until 1537, when it was dissolved and Richard Harrison (the last Abbot) and three of his monks were executed by King Henry VIII following their implication (probably unjustly) in the Lincolnshire Rising of the previous year.

The abbey and manor of Kirkstead passed to the Duke of Suffolk, Henry VIII's brother-in-law, and later to the Clintons, Earls of Lincoln, who built a large country house. By 1791 that too had gone, and all that remains today is a dramatic crag of masonry - a fragment of the south transept wall of the abbey church and the earthworks of the vast complex of buildings that once surrounded it.

The church of St Leonard's Without, thus named as it was outside the gates of the abbey, stands in a field by the side of the ruins of the abbey. Built between 1230 and 1240 it is an excellent example of the Early English style. Measuring only  by  it is up to "Cathedral standards" and may well have been built as a chantry chapel in memory of Robert de Tattershall who died in 1212. 

After many centuries use as a church, it closed in 1877, when a Presbyterian congregation was evicted. From 1883 "The Society for the Protection of Ancient Buildings" fought to save it from total decay. Eventually during 1913 and 1914 it was restored by the architect Weir.

Kirkstead remained an isolated hamlet, but the area by the River Witham, 'Kirkstead Wharfs', developed as a locally important trading point on the canal system for goods being imported and exported in the local area, including coal.

The resulting carriage trade, carrying the gentry to and from the spa, lasted until 1855 when a branch line opened from Kirkstead Station, (which then became known as Woodhall Junction) to Woodhall Spa and Horncastle. Woodhall Spa and Horncastle stations were closed to passengers in 1954. Woodhall Junction closed with the closure of its railway line in 1970.

The arrival of the railways greatly decreased the isolation of Kirkstead and the surrounding area. Kirkstead Wharfs was absorbed by the encroaching civil parish of Woodhall Spa in 1894. The remainder was incorporated into the parish in 1987, so that Kirkstead is now the western part of Woodhall Spa between the village centre and the River Witham.

The Kirkstead Bridge is a concrete arch bridge spanning the River Witham at Kirkstead in Woodhall Spa. Finished and opened in 1968, it carries the B1191 as it runs from Horncastle to the A15 road just north of Dunsby St Andrew. The bridge replaced an existing swing bridge alongside it. That had replaced a ferry that  operated until the early 20th century.

See also
 St Leonard's Without
 Kirkstead Abbey

References

External links

Villages in Lincolnshire
Former civil parishes in Lincolnshire
East Lindsey District